Alosa braschnikowi, the Caspian marine shad or Brazhnikov's shad, is one of the clupeid fish species endemic to the Caspian Sea.

This is a relatively large shad, typically 30 cm and up to 50 cm length. It also has a more "herring-like" body shape than other Caspian shad species, being a slender and elongate fish. It has well developed teeth in both jaws.

Alosa braschnikowi feeds on small fishes but also on crustaceans and occasionally other invertebrates. It performs migrations within the Caspian Sea, but does not enter rivers. Several subspecies have been described, with different breeding habits and with varying gill raker numbers. The suggested subspecies include:

Alosa braschnikowi agrachanica (Mikhailovskaya, 1941), western Caspian, or southeast in winter
Alosa braschnikowi autumnalis (Berg, 1915), southern Caspian
Alosa braschnikowi brashnikovi (Borodin, 1904), all Caspian, spawning in north
Alosa braschnikowi grimmi (Borodin, 1904),  eastern coasts of southern Caspian
Alosa braschnikowi kisselevitshi (Bulgakov, 1926)
Alosa braschnikowi nirchi (Morosov, 1928), the Krasnovodsk herring, present in the Krasnovodsk Gulf and the Kenderli Bay.
Alosa braschnikowi orientalis (Mikhailovskaya, 1941), eastern part of southern Caspian
Alosa braschnikowi sarensis (Mikhailovskaya, 1941), western part of southern Caspian.

Even Alosa curensis and Alosa maeotica have sometimes been listed as subspecies of A. brashnikovi; the latter is from the Pontic basin and now considered distinct (non-Caspian) species.  Several further synonyms exist.

References

braschnikowi
Fish of the Caspian Sea
Fish described in 1904